Twogether is an album by pianist John Hicks and alto saxophonist Frank Morgan. It was released by HighNote Records.

Recording and music
The three piano solo tracks were recorded in New Hope, Pennsylvania, in 2006. The four duet tracks were recorded at The Jazz Bakery, Los Angeles, in November 2005.

Release
Twogether was released by HighNote Records. Both musicians died shortly after the recordings: Hicks in May 2006 and Morgan in December 2007.

Reception

The AllMusic reviewer commented that "Whether Morgan saw his role at the gig as second banana or Hicks just had the more dominant stage presence, Morgan's reticence to make this an equal partnership shows as he holds himself back from engaging fully as a duet partner. Twogether is a pretty, relaxed set of music, but one wonders what might have been if both parties had been willing and able to go all out.

Track listing
 "Parisian Thoroughfare"
 "Night in Tunisia"
 "My One and Only Love"
 "Is That So?"
 "Round Midnight"
 "N.Y. Theme"
 "Passion Flower"

Personnel
 John Hicks – piano
 Frank Morgan – alto sax (tracks 2, 3, 5, 6)

References

HighNote Records albums
John Hicks (jazz pianist) albums
Frank Morgan (musician) albums
2010 albums